The Norwegian order of precedence is the hierarchy of officials in the Government of Norway used to direct seating and ranking on formal occasions, decided by the King, which came into effect from 1 July 1993.

I.
The President of the National Assembly, the Prime Minister, the Chief of the Supreme Court, the Vice President of the National Assembly and members of the Cabinet with spouses have, in the Royal Court, rank and seat second to the Royal Family and foreign royal and princely persons. Following these, the Lord Chamberlain, ambassadors of foreign powers, the presidents and vice presidents of the Lagting and Odelsting with spouses.

II.
Officials of the Court have rank and file as such:
The Mistress of the Robes - with generals
Marshal of the Court, Cabinet Secretary - with lieutenant generals
Chamberlain, Directors of the Royal Administration, the Royal Household and the King's and the Crown Prince's attendant staff - with major generals.
Members of The Civil Staff - with brigadiers.
Dames of the Court - with colonels

III.
Bearers of The Royal Norwegian Order of St. Olav's Grand Cross with collar have rank and seat directly after the Mistress of the Robes. Bearers of the War Cross (Krigskorset) with sword, the Medal for Outstanding Civic Achievement (Medaljen for Borgerdåd), the Grand Cross of the Royal Norwegian Order of St. Olav and the Royal Order of Merit's Grand Cross have rank and seat before Marshals of the Court and Cabinet Secretaries.

IV.
Civil servants in the State's employment have same rank and seat as dignitaries of the court of the same rank, after seniority. Unranked spouses follow the rank of the ranked spouse.

V.
Those by court employed who are given an honourable discharge keep their position's title and rank.

The King and Queen (King Harald V and Queen Sonja)
The Crown Prince and Crown Princess (Crown Prince Haakon Magnus and Crown Princess Mette-Marit)
The President of the National Assembly
The Prime Minister
The Chief of the Supreme Court
The Vice President of the National Assembly
The Members of the Cabinet:
Minister of Finance 
Minister of Agriculture and Food 
Minister of Foreign Affairs
Minister of Research and Higher Education 
Minister of Local Government and Regional Development 
Minister of Defence 
Minister of the Environment and International Development 
Minister of Trade and Industry 
Minister of Labour and Social Inclusion 
Minister of Transport and Communications 
Minister of Justice and the Police
Minister of Culture and Church Affairs
Minister of Health and Care Services
Minister of Government Administration and Reform 
Minister of Petroleum and Energy 
Minister for Children and Equality 
Minister of Education 
Minister of Fisheries and Coastal Affairs 
The Lord Chamberlain
Ambassadors of foreign powers
The Mistress of the Robes - with generals
Bearers of the Royal Norwegian Order of St. Olav with collar
Bearers of the War Cross (Krigskorset) with sword, the Medal for Civil Accomplishments (Borgerdådsmedaljen), the Grand Cross of the Royal Norwegian Order of St. Olav and the Royal Order of Merit's Grand Cross
Marshal of the Court, Cabinet Secretary - with lieutenant generals
Chamberlain, Directors of the Royal Administration, the Royal Household and the King's and the Crown Prince's attendant staff - with major generals.
Members of The Civil Staff - with brigadiers.
Dames of the Court - with colonels

External links
Unofficial website on The Royal Norwegian Order of St. Olav (In English with translations to French, Italian, Portuguese, German, Spanish, Dutch, Russian, Chinese and Japanese) 
 The Collection of Henrik Revens Website features orders and medals of Norway as well as other Nordic countries.
 Members of the Norwegian Government

Politics of Norway
Norwegian monarchy
Orders of precedence